Peltina is a genus of flies in the family Stratiomyidae.

Species
Peltina cazieri (James, 1953)
Peltina fuliginosa Lindner, 1964
Peltina nigrimanus James, 1972

References

Stratiomyidae
Brachycera genera
Taxa named by Erwin Lindner
Diptera of North America
Diptera of South America